Grand River Township is one of twenty-four townships in Bates County, Missouri, and is part of the Kansas City metropolitan area within the USA.  As of the 2000 census, its population was 251.

Grand River Township was established in 1870, and named after the Grand River.

Geography
According to the United States Census Bureau, Grand River Township covers an area of 25.06 square miles (64.9 square kilometers).

Unincorporated towns
 Altona at 
(This list is based on USGS data and may include former settlements.)

Adjacent townships
 Dayton Township, Cass County (north)
 Mingo Township (east)
 Spruce Township (southeast)
 Shawnee Township (south)
 Mound Township (southwest)
 Deer Creek Township (west)
 Austin Township, Cass County (northwest)

School districts
 Adrian County R-III
 Ballard R-II
 Cass County R-V

Political districts
 Missouri's 4th congressional district
 State House District 120
 State Senate District 31

References
 United States Census Bureau 2008 TIGER/Line Shapefiles
 United States Board on Geographic Names (GNIS)
 United States National Atlas

External links
 US-Counties.com
 City-Data.com

Townships in Bates County, Missouri
Townships in Missouri